Raffray's bandicoot (Peroryctes raffrayana) is a species of marsupial in the family Peroryctidae. It is found in Indonesia and Papua New Guinea. Its natural habitat is subtropical or tropical dry forests.

It is known as pakam in the Kalam language of Papua New Guinea.

References

Peramelemorphs
Endemic fauna of Papua New Guinea
Marsupials of New Guinea
Mammals of Papua New Guinea
Least concern biota of Oceania
Mammals described in 1878
Taxonomy articles created by Polbot